Jack Devlin may refer to:

Jack Devlin (Australian politician)
Jack Devlin (American politician)
Jack Devlin, in Ex on the Beach (series 6)
Jack Devlin, character in The Net, 1995 film
Jack Devlin, character in Tin Star, 2017 TV Series